The Angie Pepper Band was a post-punk band formed in Sydney, Australia. 

It was formed around Angie Pepper, who first became prominent as the vocalist of another Sydney band, The Passengers, who released one single ("Face With No Name", 1982) on the Phantom label. 

After Pepper married Radio Birdman co-founder Deniz Tek, they played together in the short-lived Angie Pepper Band, whose ranks also included Clyde Bramley (a future Hoodoo Guru) and Ivor Hay (a former drummer in The Saints). 

The band was short lived but in 1984 recorded a single called "Frozen World". 

In 2001, tracks recorded by The Passengers and the Angie Pepper Band were compiled on an LP and CD called It's Just that I Miss You (Citadel Records). 

In 2003, Angie Pepper released Res Ipsa Loquitor on Career Records, her first album of newly recorded material in years, which signals a powerful renaissance for this great singer. She has been described by Aretha Franklin's producer Arif Mardin as having a "most special voice".

Personnel
Angie Pepper - vocals
Deniz Tek - Guitar
Steve Harris - keyboards
Ivor Hay - drums
Clyde Bramley - Bass

Discography

External links
Deniz Tek official website, "The Angie Pepper Band" page 
Review of new Angie Pepper album "Res Isopa Loquitor"

Australian punk rock groups
New South Wales musical groups